Sterling Township may refer to:

 Sterling Township, Whiteside County, Illinois
 Sterling Township, Crawford County, Indiana
 Sterling Township, Hodgeman County, Kansas
 Sterling Township, Rice County, Kansas
 Sterling Township, Michigan, now Sterling Heights
 Sterling Township, Blue Earth County, Minnesota
 Sterling Township, Brown County, Ohio
 Sterling Township, Wayne County, Pennsylvania

Township name disambiguation pages